Demonstrator pens are pens which are partially or mostly transparent.

Demonstrator pens were originally furnished by manufacturers to dealers, so that the features of their products could be shown to potential buyers. The first demonstrators had openings cut in their barrels, and usually, their caps. These would typically allow direct viewing of the filling mechanism and the section-inner cap junction, respectively. Cutaway demonstrators were usually not fully functional pens, and many were furnished without nibs or with nonfunctional dummy nibs.

The first transparent demonstrator pens were probably Parker's Bakelite-barreled eyedropper-fillers, which were soon made a regular production model. Most transparent demonstrators, however, postdate the general adoption of celluloid for fountain pen manufacture. Parker and Sheaffer both made fully transparent versions of their best-selling Duofold and Balance models in the early 1930s. Other demonstrators were only partially transparent, the transparency highlighting the pen's special features. Examples include the transparent-barreled Parker Vacuum Filler demonstrators (showing the filling mechanism) and the Parker 51 demonstrators with transparent hoods (showing the collector).

Dollar Stationery makes the 717i (Demonstrator), variations of the 717i pens, the other being the calligraphy version called 717i قلم. The demo and normal versions are very popular unlike the calligraphy version. In contrast to the past, where demonstrator pens were made in very limited numbers and not sold to the public, these pens are regular production items, though sometimes made as limited editions. This trend may be traced back to Pelikan's transparent green M800 and transparent blue Blue Ocean M800 of 1992.

External links 

 Ancora "Acqua" Demonstrator

Pens